Zoetrope is a 2011 Irish experimental film directed by Rouzbeh Rashidi that tells the visual report of a family. Zoetrope deals with the quality of being expressive, explores the locations and reveals a life in a small house and its surrounding. The film slowly evolves and shows the history of nothingness of the characters who are in Zoetrope.

Production
Rouzbeh Rashidi made this film with no budget with a Web-Camera in only two days. The shots in this film are extremely lengthy and all static.

Further reading
 Review of the film Zoetrope (2011) By Jit Phokaew

References

External links

Zoetrope on Mubi (website)

2011 films
Films set in Ireland
Irish avant-garde and experimental films
2010s avant-garde and experimental films
2010s English-language films